ArviZ is a Python package for exploratory analysis of Bayesian models.

When working with Bayesian models there are a series of related tasks that need to be addressed besides inference itself:

 Diagnoses of the quality of the inference, this is needed when using numerical methods such as Markov chain Monte Carlo techniques
 Model criticism, including evaluations of both model assumptions and model predictions
 Comparison of models, including model selection or model averaging
 Preparation of the results for a particular audience

All these tasks are part of the Exploratory analysis of Bayesian models approach, and successfully performing them is central to the iterative and interactive modeling process. These tasks require both numerical and visual summaries.

ArviZ offers data structures for manipulating data common in Bayesian analysis, like numerical samples from the posterior, prior predictive and posterior predictive distributions as well as observed data. Additionally, many numerical and visual diagnostics as well as plots are available. The ArviZ name is derived from reading "rvs" (the short form of random variates) as a word instead of spelling it and also using the particle "viz" usually used to abbreviate visualization.

ArviZ is an open source project, developed by the community and is an affiliated project of NumFOCUS. and it has been used to help interpret inference problems in several scientific domains, including astronomy, neuroscience, physics and statistics.

Library features
 InferenceData object for Bayesian data manipulation. This object is based on xarray
 Plots using two alternative backends matplotlib or bokeh 
 Numerical summaries and diagnostics for Markov chain Monte Carlo methods.
 Integration with established probabilistic programming languages including; PyStan (the Python interface of Stan), PyMC, Edward Pyro, and easily integrated with novel or bespoke Bayesian analyses. ArviZ is also available in Julia, using the ArviZ.jl interface

See also
bayesplot is an R package providing an extensive library of plotting functions for use after fitting Bayesian models (typically with Markov chain Monte Carlo)

loo R package for efficient Leave-One-Out Cross-Validation and WAIC for Bayesian Models

References

External links 
 ArviZ web site

Computational statistics
Free Bayesian statistics software
Monte Carlo software
Numerical programming languages
Probabilistic software